Ovando is a surname. Notable people with the surname include:

Alfredo Ovando Candía (1918–1982), Bolivian general, president and dictator
Clementina Díaz y de Ovando (1916–2012), Mexican writer and researcher
Diego de Cáceres y Ovando, Spanish nobleman
Diego Fernández de Ovando, Spanish military and nobleman
Diego Fernández de Cáceres y Ovando (died after 1487), Spanish military and nobleman
Eduardo Ovando Martínez (born 1955), Mexican politician
Fernando Alfón de Ovando, Spanish military and nobleman
Fernando Fernández de Ovando, Spanish diplomat and nobleman
Francisco José de Ovando, 1st Marquis of Brindisi (c. 1693–1755), Spanish soldier and governor of Chile
Hernán Pérez de Ovando, Spanish military man and nobleman
Janette Ovando (born 1977), Mexican politician 
Javier Ovando (born c. 1977), Honduran immigrant framed by the LAPD
José Luis Ovando Patrón (born 1970), Mexican politician
Marcos Ramírez de Prado y Ovando (1592–1667), Spanish Roman Catholic prelate
Neriman Ovando (born 1991), Dominican footballer 
Nicolás de Ovando (1460–1511), Spanish soldier and governor of the Indies
Sancho Fernández de Ovando, Spanish nobleman